This is a list of compositions by Felix Weingartner.

Piano

Piano solo
Skizzen, Op. 1
Tonbilder zu Adalbert Stifters Studien, Op. 2
Aus vergangener Zeit, Op. 3
Lose Blätter, Op. 4
Phantasiebilder, Op. 5
Herbstblätter, Op. 58

Chamber music

Violin and piano
Violin Sonata #1 in D, Op. 42/1
Violin Sonata #2 in F minor, Op. 42/2

String quartets
String Quartet #1 in D minor, Op. 24
String Quartet #2 in F minor, Op. 26
String Quartet #3 in F major, Op. 34
String Quartet #4 in D major, Op. 62
String Quartet #5 in E major, Op. 81

String quintet
String Quintet in C major, Op. 40

Other
Piano Sextet in E minor, Op. 33
Quintet in G minor for Clarinet, Violin, Viola, Cello and Piano, Op. 50
Octet in G major for Clarinet, Horn, Bassoon, Two Violins, Viola, Cello and Piano, Op. 73
String Trio #2 in A Major, Op. 93/2

Orchestral

Symphonies
Symphony No. 1 in G major, Op. 23 (1899)
Symphony No. 2 in E major, Op. 29 (1901)
Symphony No. 3 in E major, Op. 49 (1910)
Symphony No. 4 in F major, Op. 61 (1917)
Symphony No. 5 in C minor, Op. 71 (1926)
Symphony No. 6 "La Tragica" in B minor, Op. 74 (1929)
Symphony No. 7 "Choral" in C major, Op. 87 (1935-7), on poems by Carmen Studer and Friedrich Hölderlin.

Symphonic poems
König Lear, Op. 20 (1895)
Das Gefilde der Seligen, Op. 21 (1892)
La Burla, Op. 78
Frühling, Op. 80

Violin and orchestra
Violin Concerto in G major, Op. 52

Cello and orchestra
Cello Concerto in A minor, Op. 60

Other
Serenade in F major for String Orchestra, Op. 6
Lustige Overture for Orchestra, Op. 53 (1910)
'Aus ernster Zeit', Ouverture for Orchestra, Op. 56
An die Schweiz, Variations for Orchestra, Op. 79
Sinfonietta, Op. 83
Bilder aus Japan, Op. 91
Der Sturm, Ouverture for Orchestra (1918)
Der Sturm, Suite for Orchestra

Operas
Sakuntala, Op. 9
Malawika (und Agnimitra), Op. 10
Genesius, Op. 14
Orestes, Op. 30, 1902 Oper Leipzig (trilogy):
Agamemnon, Op. 30/1
Das Totenopfer, Op. 30/2
Die Erinyen, Op. 30/3
Kain und Abel, Op. 54
Dame Kobold, Op. 57
Die Dorfschule, Op. 64
Meister Andrea, Op. 66
Der Apostat, Op. 72

Incidental music
Musik zu Goethes Faust, Op. 43
Der Sturm, Op. 65
Terra, ein Symbol

Choral music
Traumnacht und Sturmhymnus, Op. 38
Freiheitsgesang, Op. 67
Auferstehung, Op. 69
Immer, Op. 86/1
Ave-Maria-Läuten, Op. 86/2
Verheißung, Op. 86/3

Lieder
Lieder für Singstimme und Klavier, Op. 7
Lieder für Singstimme und Klavier, Op. 8
Die Wallfahrt nach Kevelaer, Op. 12
Lieder für Singstimme und Klavier, Op. 13
Acht Lieder für Singstimme und Klavier, Op. 15
Acht Lieder für Singstimme und Klavier, Op. 16
Drei Lieder für Singstimme und Klavier, Op. 17
Severa, Op. 18
Hilaria, Op. 19
Zwölf Gedichte für Sopran / Tenor und Klavier, Op. 22
Sechs Lieder für Sopran / Tenor und Klavier, Op. 25
Drei Gedichte aus Gottfried Kellers Jugendzeit, Op. 27
Zwölf Lieder für Sopran / Tenor und Klavier, Op. 28
Vier Lieder für Sopran / Tenor und Klavier, Op. 31
Sechs Märchenlieder für Sopran / Tenor und Klavier, Op. 32
Unruhe der Nacht, Op. 35,1
Stille der Nacht, Op. 35,2
Lieder und Gesänge für Singstimme und Orchester, Op. 36
Zwei Balladen von Carl Spitteler, Op. 37
Aus fernen Welten, Op. 39
Drei Lieder für Singstimme und Klavier, Op. 44
Lieder für Singstimme und Klavier, Op. 45
Fünf Lieder für Singstimme und Klavier, Op. 46
Vier Lieder für Singstimme und Klavier, Op. 47
Sechs Lieder für Singstimme und Klavier, Op. 48
Abendlieder, Op. 51
Vier Lieder für Singstimme und Klavier, Op. 55
Daheim, Op. 59
Blüten aus dem Osten, Op. 63
Lieder für Singstimme und Klavier, Op. 68
Lieder für Singstimme und Klavier, Op. 70
Lieder für Singstimme und Klavier, Op. 75
Lieder für Singstimme und Klavier, Op. 76
An den Schmerz, Op. 77
Der Weg, Op. 82
Rom, Op. 90

External links
List of compositions (in German)

Weingartner